Cypress Mill is an unincorporated community in Blanco County, in the U.S. state of Texas. According to the Handbook of Texas, the community had a population of 56 in 2000.

History
Cypress Mill developed around a mill that was built here in the late 1860s on Cypress Creek. It was originally called Fuchs' Mill for mill owner Wilhelm Fuchs and his family. A post office was established at Cypress Mill in 1874 and remained in operation until the late 1980s. 130 people lived in the community and were served by a cotton gin and some gristmills and sawmills in the mid-1880s. The most common crops shipped by area farmers were cotton, cattle, and wool. Its population zenith was 200 sometime before 1900 but declined soon after, falling to 30 by the early 1940s. By the end of that decade, the population grew to 60 and had a business and several houses. Its population was 76 in 1970 and then 56 from 1980 through 2000.

Geography

Climate
The climate in this area is characterized by hot, humid summers and generally mild to cool winters. According to the Köppen Climate Classification system, Cypress Mill has a humid subtropical climate, abbreviated "Cfa" on climate maps.

Education
Cypress Mill is served by the Johnson City Independent School District.

References

Unincorporated communities in Blanco County, Texas
Unincorporated communities in Texas